Aristotelia mirandella is a species of moth in the family Gelechiidae. It was described by Pierre Chrétien in 1908. It is found in Algeria and has also been reported from Greece.

References

Aristotelia (moth)
Moths described in 1908
Moths of Africa
Moths of Europe